This is a list of teams that once played in the National Lacrosse League but no longer exist or have suspended operations for various reasons. This includes franchises which have relocated to different cities.

Defunct
Teams, defunct